DZS may refer to:

Companies and organizations
 DZS, a US telecommunications company
 The Croatian Bureau of Statistics, Državni zavod za statistiku
 Detroit Zoological Society, operators of the Detroit Zoo

Other 
 Hungarian dzs, a letter in the Hungarian language